Nahum Thorton Grymes, better known by his stage name J. Holiday, is an American singer, songwriter, and rapper. He came into prominence in 2007 with his breakthrough hit "Bed", peaking at number five on the US Billboard Hot 100. His debut album, Back of My Lac', was released in October 2007 and peaked at number 5 on the US Billboard 200. The album would also hit number 32 in the United Kingdom. Back of My Lac has sold just over 700,000 copies worldwide.

His second album, Round 2 was released on March 10, 2009. It peaked at number four on the Billboard 200 and contain only one single, "It's Yours". After label changes and several release delays, Holiday's third album, Guilty Conscience, was released in January 2014 and peaked at number 42 on the Top R&B/Hip Hop Albums chart, making it his lowest charting album in that entry. He released his fourth studio album Time on February 7, 2022.

Early life 
Nahom Thorton Grymes was born in Washington, D.C. to an African-American mother Frances Grymes, and an Eritrean father. His name is inspired by a biblical figure because he is the son of a preacher. Holiday was raised alone by his mother in Washington, D.C. and Alexandria, Virginia, after his father died when he was just eleven. His mother made sure that her son completed his education and attended church. Holiday attended a local high school where he displayed his singing talent during a showcase night. By then, he frequently listened to Marvin Gaye, Boyz II Men, Tupac Shakur, R. Kelly, and Jodeci. Although he had the passion to go deep onto the music path, his mother wanted him to complete his education. Upon his graduation, Holiday began recording demo tapes.

Career

2006–2008: Back of My Lac
J. Holiday signed a recording deal with Capitol Records in 2006. He released his debut album, Back of My Lac', in October 2007. The album debuted on the U.S. Billboard 200 chart at number 5 selling 105,000 copies in its first week. It debuted at #1 on the Top R&B/Hip-Hop Albums. The album debuted in the Top 20 R&B/Hip Hop albums in Canada and charted within the Top 100 albums in Canada. It became a Top 10 R&B/Hip Hop album in the UK and a Top 40 UK album entry peaking at #32. In the U.S. it also made it to #8 on the Tastemakers chart and #5 on the Top Digital Albums and Billboard Comprehensive Albums Chart. The lead single from this album was "Be with Me", which stalled at #83 on the Hot R&B/Hip-Hop Songs Chart. 
"Bed" was released as the album's second single on June 19, 2007. Debuted on the U.S. Billboard Hot 100 in the issue week of July 4, 2007, at number 89 and has peaked at number 5. It was number 1 on the Hot R&B/Hip-Hop Songs for five weeks in a row. The single has also debuted on BET's 106 & Park countdown at number 9 on Tuesday July 31, 2007. On Wednesday, August 15, 2007, "Bed" hit number one on its 11th day on the countdown. J. Holiday also performed "Bed" on 106 & Park on August 17, 2007.
"Bed" was also performed on Showtime at the Apollo along with the single "Suffocate". This song was #70 on Rolling Stones list of the 100 Best Songs of 2007. The video for "Bed" was ranked the #11 video of 2007 on BET: Notarized. His video for the third single, "Suffocate," debuted on BET's 106 & Park on November 7, 2007. The video was shot in Paris, France. "Come Here" was released as a single but was ultimately canceled.

2008–2009: Round 2
Round 2 is the second studio album by Contemporary R&B singer J. Holiday. The album was released on March 10, 2009. The album is the follow-up to his gold-selling debut album Back of My Lac'. The album sold 55,000 units in its first week and debuted at number 4 on the Billboard 200. "It's Yours" is the first single from singer J. Holiday's second studio album, Round 2. The single features production from The Co-Stars (Teairra Mari's Make Her Feel Good), and Jasper Cameron (Lloyd's Player's Prayer). The song was well received, becoming the most added single at Urban Mainstream radio the week of December 13, 2008. "It's Yours" peaked at 25 on the US R&B chart. The second single that was supposed to be released was "Fall", but due to label problems it was canceled like "Come Here" on his previous album.

2012–2014: Guilty Conscience
In 2010, J. Holiday left Capitol Records and signed to Def Jam at the time working on his third album. He then released his mixtape, M.I.A: The Lost Pages, in 2011, in promotion of the album. In early 2012, J. Holiday left Def Jam Recordings. On May 29, 2012, he released his single "Sign My Name", from his upcoming third studio album. J. Holiday has been receiving heavy rotation of his single “Sign My Name” and has been on multiple radio stations giving the fans what they need. His “Sign My Name” Tour has kept him busy to the point of have performance dates booked months in advance. He embark as the headliner in the upcoming “Bad Boyz of R&B” Tour and the release of the movie “School of HardKnocks” that he is starring in alongside Elise Neal, Erica Hubbard and Cisco Reyes is highly anticipated. In July 2013, he revealed the title of his third studio album, titled Guilty Conscience, via Facebook. The album was scheduled to be released on November 11, 2013. He announced the lead single for the album titled "After We Fuck", will be sent to urban radio soon. The album was pushed back until December 10, 2013. A music video for the single will be released on November 5, 2013. Guilty Conscience was pushed back again and was released on January 28, 2014 through his label Holiday Music Group. The album achieved #42 on Top R&B/Hip-Hop Albums.

2018–present: Time
On October 5, 2018, the lead single "25 to Life" was released, and an upcoming album entitled Time has been announced in the works. His 2019 single "Feel Like" was released, and has also announced his upcoming tour "Underrated Part I" which started in Birmingham, Alabama on August 3, 2019. The album was released on February 7, 2022.

Discography 

Studio albums
 Back of My Lac' (2007)
 Round 2 (2009)
 Guilty Conscience (2014)
 Time (2022)

Filmography

Tours
 The Double Up Tour (with R. Kelly, Ne-Yo, & Keyshia Cole) (2007)
 The Guilty Conscience Tour (2013)

Awards and nominations
American Music Awards

|-
||2008
||J. Holiday
|Favorite Soul/R&B Male Artist
|
|-

BET Awards

|-
||2008
||J. Holiday
|Best Male R&B Artist
|
|-

Grammy Awards

|-
||2009
||Back of My Lac'
|Best Contemporary R&B Album 
|
|-

NAACP Image Awards

|-
||2008
||J. Holiday
|Outstanding New Artist
|
|-

References

External links
 
 

1981 births
Living people
21st-century American singers
20th-century African-American male singers
American hip hop singers
American people of Eritrean descent
American contemporary R&B singers
Capitol Records artists
Def Jam Recordings artists
Singers from Washington, D.C.
21st-century American male singers
21st-century African-American male singers